The SteelDrivers is the eponymous debut album by The SteelDrivers. It was released by Rounder Records on January 15, 2008.

Critical reception

Cybergrass writes, "When originally released, the album peaked at #57 on the Billboard Country Albums chart, and garnered a GRAMMY® nomination  for Best Country Performance by a Duo or Group with Vocals for "Blue Side of the Mountain.""

Robert Short of PopMatters gives the album 7 out of a possible 10 stars and says, "After road-testing the material in clubs and festivals, the band is finally ready to unveil their debut set of eleven originals. Amongst its other industry vets, fiddler Tammy Rogers, mandolin player Mike Henderson, bassist Mike Fleming, and banjo player Richard Bailey, these players have performed and recorded with everyone from Al Green to Waylon Jennings, Reba McEntire to Bo Diddley."

Jonathan Keefe of Slant Magazine gives the album 3½ out of a possible 5 stars and writes, "the self-titled debut for The SteelDrivers, a five-piece outfit  veteran Nashville session musicians, is the kind of break from tradition that can bring some much needed new energy to a tired genre."

Track listing

Notes
Chris Stapleton recorded a solo version of "Midnight Train to Memphis" on his album From A Room: Volume 2 (2017).

Musicians
Richard Bailey – banjo
Mike Flemming – bass, vocals
Tammy Rogers – fiddle, vocals
Chris Stapleton – guitar, vocals
Mike Henderson – mandolin

Production
Mastered by Luke Wooten
Mixed by Luke Wooten
Produced by Luke Wooten, The SteelDrivers

Track information and credits verified from the album's liner notes.

References

External links
The SteelDrivers Official Site
Rounder Records Official Site

2008 debut albums
Rounder Records albums
The SteelDrivers albums